Kashiani is an upazila of Gopalganj District in the Division of Dhaka, Bangladesh.

Geography
It has a total area 299.64 km2.

Demographics

According to the 2011 Bangladesh census, Kashiani Upazila had 46,335 households and a population of 207,615, 2.6% of whom lived in urban areas. 10.6% of the population was under the age of 5. The literacy rate (age 7 and over) was 59.2%, compared to the national average of 51.8%.

Administration
Kashiani Upazila is divided into 14 union parishads: Bethuri, Hataira, Kashiani, Mahespur, Mamudpur, Nijamkandi, Orakandi, Parulia, Puisur, Pukra, Rajpat, Ratail, Sajail and Singa. The union parishads are subdivided into 151 mauzas and 162 villages.

Chairman: Jani Alom Mia
Vice Chairman: Khaza Newoz
Woman Vice Chairman: Minazaman

Upazila Nirbahi Officer (UNO): A.S.M. Myeenuddin

Kasiani News Paper- 1 : Weekly Kasiani Barta. Editor : Hanif Mahmud (Publish 8 June 2014)Publish by Hanif Mahmud from Bismilla Ofset Press, Kasiani.

See also
Upazilas of Bangladesh
Districts of Bangladesh
Divisions of Bangladesh

References

Upazilas of Gopalganj District, Bangladesh